This is a list of the current Ambassadors of Nigeria.

References

Nigeria
Nigerian diplomats
Nigeria diplomacy-related lists